Phạm Thị Phú (born 19 March 1964) is a Vietnamese swimmer. She competed in the women's 100 metre breaststroke at the 1980 Summer Olympics.

References

External links
 

1964 births
Living people
Vietnamese female breaststroke swimmers
Olympic swimmers of Vietnam
Swimmers at the 1980 Summer Olympics
Place of birth missing (living people)
21st-century Vietnamese women